Sara Delano Roosevelt Memorial House is a building that was built in 1908 and listed on the National Register of Historic Places in 1980. The Neo-Georgian townhouse was designed by Charles A. Platt for Sara Ann Delano Roosevelt in 1907.  It originally held "two mirror-image residences with a single facade and entrance. Each first floor had its own front reception room with a welcoming fireplace. Rear parlors could be combined through sliding doors." The house was given to the Roosevelts by Franklin's mother as a wedding gift for them. The house was originally two homes and Franklin's mother had doors put in place so she could enter their part of the home whenever she wanted. 

The house was used by Sara Ann Delano Roosevelt from its completion in 1908 to her death in 1941, and intermittently by Franklin and Eleanor Roosevelt from construction to their sale of the house to Hunter College in 1943. After his mother's death in 1941, President Roosevelt and his wife placed the house up for sale and a non-profit consortium was organized to purchase the house on behalf of Hunter College.

The house was closed in 1992 and reopened in 2010 after an $18 million renovation. Leslie E. Robertson Associates were the structural engineers on this renovation. The building is currently used by Hunter College as the Roosevelt House Public Policy Institute at Hunter College or, simply, Roosevelt House.

References 

 "Fixing Monument To Mother-in-Law; Sara Delano Roosevelt Ruled Home of Franklin and Eleanor"

External links 

 Roosevelt House Public Policy Institute main page
 NYC-Architecture.com Roosevelt Memorial House pictures
 Film:  Treasures of New York: Roosevelt House

1908 establishments in New York City
Houses completed in 1908
Houses on the National Register of Historic Places in Manhattan
Hunter College
New York City Designated Landmarks in Manhattan
Presidential homes in the United States
Sara Delano